Howard Liddell may refer to:

 Howard Liddell (psychologist) (1895–1967), American professor of psychology
 Howard Liddell (architect) (1945–2013), British architect